The Los Angeles River: Its Life, Death, and Possible Rebirth is a 1999 American non-fiction book written by Blake Gumprecht.

Overview
An investigative look into the history of the Los Angeles River and the crucial role it played in the settlement and growth of Los Angeles.

Article
A December 8, 2003, article by writer Charlie LeDuff for The New York Times entitled Los Angeles by Kayak: Vistas of Concrete Banks was accused of drawing from The Los Angeles River: Its Life, Death, and Possible Rebirth. One week later, on December 15, 2003, The New York Times appended a clarification:

LeDuff discussed various accusations made against his reporting in a March 11, 2008 interview with essayist Dan Schneider.

References

External links
Goodreads

English-language books
1999 non-fiction books
Books about Los Angeles